Bitchfield and Bassingthorpe is a civil parish which includes Boothby Pagnell and Burton Coggles in the South Kesteven district of Lincolnshire, England.  According to the 2001 census it had a population of 154 across 59 homes.  By the 2011 census there were 157 households, made of 366 people. 
 
The civil parish includes the villages of Bitchfield and Bassingthorpe, and the hamlet of Westby. 

There are no major roads through the parish, though the London-Edinburgh railway line passes through the extreme western edge.  The parish is crossed by the B1176 Corby Glen to Grantham road. Several small streams rise in the western half of the parish, and flow eastwards into the West Glen River which flows through the parish from North to South.  Bassingthorpe manor is probably the highest spot in the parish, with a spot height of 106m.  The terrain slopes down eastward to the  shallow valley of the glen, which lies between two 70m contours.  Toward the eastern boundary the land rises again to about 90m.

Busses on route 4 from Grantham to Stamford pass through the parish. 

Local Democracy takes the form of a Parish Meeting

References

External links

Civil parishes in Lincolnshire
South Kesteven District